The women's 200 metre individual medley at the 2012 Summer Olympics took place on 30–31 July at the London Aquatics Centre in London, United Kingdom.

Despite allegations of doping, China's Ye Shiwen pulled away from the rest of the field to strike a medley double for the fifth straight time in Olympic history since Michelle Smith did so in 1996, Yana Klochkova in 2000 and 2004, and Australia's Stephanie Rice in 2008. Coming from third at the final turn, she opened up her lead with a superb freestyle leg to establish a new Olympic record and a sterling gold-medal time in 2:07.57. Australia's Alicia Coutts produced a striking effort to claim the silver behind the Chinese teen in a lifetime best of 2:08.15, adding it to her Olympic hardware with a full set of medals. Meanwhile, U.S. swimmer Caitlin Leverenz stormed home on the rear of a dominant breaststroke leg to take the bronze in 2:08.95.

Rice, the defending Olympic champion, finished fourth in 2:09.55, while U.S. world record holder Ariana Kukors lost her chance to climb the podium with a fifth-place time in 2:09.83. Zimbabwe's Kirsty Coventry fell short in her second attempt for an Olympic medal, earning a sixth spot in 2:11.13. Great Britain's Hannah Miley (2:11.29) and Hungary's Katinka Hosszú (2:14.19) rounded out the field.

Earlier in the semifinals, Ye threw down a fastest freestyle split of 30.59 to set an Olympic record and a textile best in 2:08.39, cutting off Rice's previous standard by six-hundredths of a second (0.06) in a since-banned high tech bodysuit.

Records 
Prior to this competition, the existing world and Olympic records were as follows.

The following records were established during the competition:

Results

Heats

Semifinals

Semifinal 1

Semifinal 2

Final

References

External links
NBC Olympics Coverage

Women's 00200 metre individual medley
2012 in women's swimming
Women's events at the 2012 Summer Olympics